Chittagong-9 is a constituency represented in the Jatiya Sangsad (National Parliament) of Bangladesh since 2018 by Mohibul Hasan Chowdhury of the Awami League.

Boundaries 
The constituency encompasses Chittagong City Corporation wards 15 through 23 and 31 through 35.

History 
The constituency was created for the first general elections in newly independent Bangladesh, held in 1973.

Ahead of the 2008 general election, the Election Commission redrew constituency boundaries to reflect population changes revealed by the 2001 Bangladesh census. The 2008 reapportionment added one seat to Chittagong City and altered the boundaries of the three other seats in the city, including this one.

Ahead of the 2014 general election, the Election Commission renumbered the seat for Sandwip Upazila from Chittagong-16 to Chittagong-3, bumping up by one the suffix of the former constituency of that name and the higher numbered constituencies in the district. Thus Chittagong-9 covers the area previously covered by Chittagong-8. Previously Chittagong-9 encompassed Chittagong City Corporation wards 11 through 14, and 24 through 26, and part of ward 8.

In the 2018 general election, the constituency was one of six chosen by lottery to use electronic voting machines.

Members of Parliament 
Key

Elections

Elections in the 2010s 

General Election 2018

General Election 2018

Elections in the 2000s

Elections in the 1990s

References

External links
 

Parliamentary constituencies in Bangladesh
Chittagong District